R-L2 is a human Y-chromosome DNA haplogroup, characteristic of a part of the inhabitants of Italy and Western Europe in general. R-L2 is thought to have originated around the Alps or southern Rhine, additionally, due to R-L2 having split off of R1b-U152 relatively early and it being a major branch, R-L2 carriers were largely contemporary with R-U152 carriers leading to R-L2 also having multiple large and diverse branches, of which some are respectively linked to Italics and the  Alpine Celts.

External links

 Haplogroup R-L2 and its descendants on YTree.net

References

R1b-l2
R